Hunting Flies is a 2016 Norwegian drama film directed by Izer Aliu. It was screened in the Discovery section at the 2016 Toronto International Film Festival. It was nominated for the 2017 Nordic Council Film Prize.

Cast
 Burhan Amiti as Ghani the Teacher

References

External links
 

2016 films
2016 drama films
Norwegian drama films
Albanian-language films